Gene Autry is a town in Carter County, Oklahoma, United States. The population was 158 as of the 2010 census, up from 99 in 2000. It is part of the Ardmore, Oklahoma Micropolitan Statistical Area.

History
The town was originally named "Lou" by C.C. Henderson for his wife; the post office was established July 11, 1883.  At the time of its founding, the community was located in Pickens County, Chickasaw Nation.  On November 22, 1883, it was renamed "Dresden". The name was changed to "Berwyn" on September 1, 1887, after Berwyn, Pennsylvania, making the Oklahoma town one of several along the Santa Fe railroad line through the Territory (re)named for stations on the "Main Line" of the Pennsylvania Railroad.

Finally, on November 16, 1941, it was renamed "Gene Autry" to honor the singer and motion picture star. Though Autry was born in Tioga, Texas, his family moved to Oklahoma while he was an infant. He was raised in the southern Oklahoma towns of Achille and Ravia. Autry had also worked as a telegraph operator near Berwyn.  In 1939 he bought the  Flying A Ranch on the west edge of Berwyn, and the town decided to honor him by changing its name. Approximately 35,000 people attended the ceremonies broadcast live from the site on Autry's Melody Ranch radio show.  Expectations that Autry would make his permanent home on the ranch were heightened when Autry’s house in California burned down just 8 days before the name change ceremony, but were dashed 21 days after the ceremony with the attack on Pearl Harbor.  Autry joined the military in 1942.   He sold the ranch after the war.  The ranch is now all but gone.

As of December 2017 Barbie Morgan was elected mayor, while former fire chief David Colaw was elected trustee and Robert Gulio was re-elected as trustee.  The current town leadership is Mayor Barbie Morgan, Vice-Mayor David Colaw, and Town Councilor Tammy Byars.

Geography
Gene Autry is located in northeastern Carter County at  (34.281858, -97.036927). It is bordered to the north by Murray County. A portion of the city of Ardmore, separate from the main part of the city, borders Gene Autry to the east and contains the Ardmore Municipal Airport. The Chickasaw National Recreation Area is to the north.

The Washita River cuts across the northeast corner of the town, flowing southeast toward Lake Texoma on the Texas border.

Climate

Demographics

As of the census of 2000, there were 99 people, 46 households, and 25 families residing in the town. There were 55 housing units at an average density of 201.5 per square mile (78.7/km2). The racial makeup of the town was 78.79% White, 5.05% African American, 7.07% Native American, 1.01% Asian, 5.05% from other races, and 3.03% from two or more races. Hispanic or Latino of any race were 8.08% of the population.

There were 46 households, out of which 23.9% had children under the age of 18 living with them, 50.0% were married couples living together, 6.5% had a female householder with no husband present, and 43.5% were non-families. 37.0% of all households were made up of individuals, and 19.6% had someone living alone who was 65 years of age or older. The average household size was 2.15 and the average family size was 2.88.

In the town, the population was spread out, with 20.2% under the age of 18, 5.1% from 18 to 24, 32.3% from 25 to 44, 26.3% from 45 to 64, and 16.2% who were 65 years of age or older. The median age was 40 years. For every 100 females, there were 115.2 males. For every 100 females age 18 and over, there were 113.5 males.

The median income for a household in the town was $16,667, and the median income for a family was $20,833. Males had a median income of $31,000 versus $13,750 for females. The per capita income for the town was $8,295. There were 27.3% of families and 30.0% of the population living below the poverty line, including 39.3% of those under 18 and 22.2% of those over 64.

Arts and culture
The Academy of Western Artists is located in Gene Autry but holds its annual awards presentations in Dallas-Fort Worth.

The town is home to the Gene Autry Historical Society which maintains the Gene Autry Oklahoma Museum. After a temporary closure, the museum was re-opened on September 26, 2015. The Museum is open Thursday-Saturday from 10AM to 4PM, and Sunday 12PM to 4PM.  The museum relates not only to the cowboy singer himself, but also other western-themed entertainers and to local history.

References

External links
 GeneAutry.com - Official Website
  Gene Autry, Oklahoma
 Gene Autry Oklahoma Museum
 Encyclopedia of Oklahoma History and Culture - Gene Autry (town)

Towns in Carter County, Oklahoma
Towns in Oklahoma
Ardmore, Oklahoma micropolitan area